The 2019 LSU Tigers baseball team represents Louisiana State University in the 2019 NCAA Division I baseball season. The Tigers play their home games at Alex Box Stadium. They, along with McNeese State and Southern, were the only three teams in the state to make the tournament.

Preseason

Preseason All-American teams

3rd Team
Daniel Cabrera - Outfielder (Collegiate Baseball)
Zack Hess - Starting Pitcher (Baseball America)

SEC media poll
The SEC media poll was released on February 7, 2019 with the Tigers predicted to win the Western Division.

Preseason All-SEC teams

2nd Team
Antoine Duplantis - Outfielder
Daniel Cabrera - Outfielder

Roster

Schedule and results

Schedule Source:
*Rankings are based on the team's current ranking in the D1Baseball poll.

Baton Rouge Regional

Record vs. conference opponents

Rankings

2019 MLB draft

References

LSU
LSU Tigers baseball seasons
LSU Tigers baseball
LSU